Table of docks (past and present) in the Port of Liverpool, Liverpool, England.

The table can be sorted on each of its columns by clicking the small box in the header. The sequence runs from North (N01) to South (S19).
(Using references:

.)

References

External links
Port of Liverpool Official Website
Liverpool North Docks Diagram, archived from the original on 30 March 2007. (retrieved 20 February 2015) 
Liverpool South Docks Diagram, archived from  the original on 30 March 2007. (retrieved 20 February 2015)

Docks
Liverpool docks